Spider-Man: Across the Spider-Verse is an upcoming American computer-animated superhero film featuring the Marvel Comics character Miles Morales / Spider-Man, produced by Columbia Pictures and Sony Pictures Animation in association with Marvel Entertainment, and distributed by Sony Pictures Releasing. It is the sequel to Spider-Man: Into the Spider-Verse (2018) and is set in a shared multiverse of alternate universes called the "Spider-Verse". The film is directed by Joaquim Dos Santos, Kemp Powers, and Justin K. Thompson (in their feature directorial debuts), from a screenplay written by Phil Lord, Christopher Miller, and David Callaham. Shameik Moore voices Miles, starring alongside Hailee Steinfeld, Jake Johnson, Issa Rae, Daniel Kaluuya, Jason Schwartzman, Brian Tyree Henry, Luna Lauren Vélez, Greta Lee, Rachel Dratch, Jorma Taccone, Shea Whigham and Oscar Isaac. In the film, Miles goes on an adventure across the multiverse with a new team of Spider-People, known as the Spider-Force.

Sony began developing a sequel to Into the Spider-Verse before that film's release in 2018, with the writing and directing team attached. It was set to focus on the relationship between Moore's Miles and Steinfeld's Gwen Stacy / Spider-Woman. The film was officially announced in November 2019 and animation work began in June 2020, with a different visual style for each of the six universes visited by the characters.

Spider-Man: Across the Spider-Verse is scheduled for release in the United States on June 2, 2023, delayed from an initial April 2022 date due to the COVID-19 pandemic. A third film, Spider-Man: Beyond the Spider-Verse, is scheduled for release on March 29, 2024, while a female-focused spin-off film is in development.

Premise 
When Miles Morales is unexpectedly approached by his best friend and love interest Gwen Stacy to complete a mission to save every universe of Spider-People from a mysterious new villain who could cause a catastrophic disaster, Miles is up for the challenge. He and Gwen journey through the Multiverse together and meet its protectors, a group of Spider-People known as the Spider-Force. However, Miles finds himself at odds with the Spider-Force on how to handle the threat.

Voice cast 

 Shameik Moore as Miles Morales / Spider-Man: A teenage graffiti artist who took over as the Spider-Man of his universe after the death of that reality's Peter Parker
 Hailee Steinfeld as Gwen Stacy / Spider-Woman: A version of Gwen Stacy who is the Spider-Woman of her universe and the drummer of a rock band
 Jake Johnson as Peter B. Parker / Spider-Man:An older, disheveled version of Peter Parker from an alternate universe who was a mentor to Miles. Parker now has a daughter named Mayday with Mary Jane Watson, whom he reconnected with at the end of Spider-Man: Into the Spider-Verse (2018).
 Issa Rae as Jessica Drew / Spider-Woman: A pregnant Spider-Woman from an alternate universe who is a member of the Spider-Force
 Daniel Kaluuya as Hobart "Hobie" Brown / Spider-Punk: A British, punk rock version of Spider-Man from an alternate universe that is ruled by a totalitarian regime
 Jason Schwartzman as Jonathan Ohnn / the Spot: A supervillain whose body is covered by interdimensional portals that allow him to travel through different universes
 Brian Tyree Henry as Jefferson Davis: Miles's father and a police officer who originally disapproved of Spider-Man's vigilante actions, but now sees Spider-Man as a hero
 Luna Lauren Vélez as Rio Morales: Miles's mother, a nurse
 Greta Lee as Lyla: Miguel's AI assistant
 Rachel Dratch as the counselor at Miles's school
 Jorma Taccone as Vulture:A bird-themed supervillain from a Renaissance-inspired universe. Taccone previously voiced Norman Osborn / Green Goblin and Peter Parker / Spider-Man from the 1967 TV series in Into the Spider-Verse.
 Shea Whigham as George Stacy: Gwen's father, a police captain
 Oscar Isaac as Miguel O'Hara / Spider-Man 2099:A Spider-Man from an alternate universe set in the year 2099 who is the leader of the Spider-Force, a group of Spider-People from alternate universes tasked with protecting the Multiverse. Isaac described O'Hara as "the one Spider-Man that doesn't have a sense of humor", while the production team nicknamed him "Property Damage Spider-Man" due to the amount of destruction that he leaves in his wake.

Karan Soni voices Pavitr Prabhakar / Spider-Man India, an Indian version of Spider-Man from an alternate universe who is a member of the Spider-Force. Additional iterations of Spider-Man slated to appear in the film are Ben Reilly / Scarlet Spider, Margo / Spider-Byte, Cyborg Spider-Woman, Takuya Yamashiro / Spider-Man from the 1978 Japanese television series, Peter Parker / Spider-Man from the Spider-Man video game series by Insomniac Games, Peter Parker / Spider-Man from the television series Spider-Man Unlimited (1999–2001), Peter Parker / Spider-Man from the television series The Spectacular Spider-Man (2008–2009), Peter Parker / Spider-Man from the Marvel Mangaverse, Otto Octavius / Superior Spider-Man, Doppelganger, Julia Carpenter / Spider-Woman, Kaine Parker, Maybelle Reilly / Lady-Spider, Charlotte Webber / Sun-Spider, Patrick O'Hara / Web-Slinger, Flash Thompson / Captain Spider, Spyder-Knight, Spidercide, Old Man Peter Parker, Earth X Spider-Man, Spider-Cop, Spider-Mechanic, Ultimate Tarantula, Underoos, Dormammu-Verse Spider-Man, Spider-Cat, Spider-Monkey, Spider-Wolf, Bombastic Bag-Man, Spider-Armour MK I, MK II and MK III, Iron Spider and Chibi Spider-Man. Peter and Mary Jane's infant daughter May "Mayday" Parker will also appear alongside the alternate Spinneret and her daughter Anna May-Parker / Spiderling from the 2015 limited series Amazing Spider-Man: Renew Your Vows.

Production

Development 
By the end of November 2018, ahead of the release of Spider-Man: Into the Spider-Verse the following month, Sony Pictures Animation had begun development on a sequel to the film, due to the "incredible buzz" surrounding the project. The sequel was set to continue the story of Shameik Moore's Miles Morales / Spider-Man, working from "seeds [that were] planted" throughout the first film. Joaquim Dos Santos and David Callaham were set to direct and write the film, respectively, with Amy Pascal returning from the first film as producer. The other producers of the first film—Phil Lord, Christopher Miller, Avi Arad, and Christina Steinberg—were all also expected to return for the sequel in some capacity. The next month, Pascal revealed that the film would focus on Miles and Hailee Steinfeld's Gwen Stacy / Spider-Woman, exploring a romance between the two characters that had been cut from the first film. She added that the sequel would serve as a "launching pad" for a previously announced female-focused spin-off film starring Steinfeld. Sony officially confirmed the sequel in November 2019, setting a release date of April 8, 2022. Lord and Miller were confirmed to be returning as producers. When making changes to its film schedule in April 2020, due to the COVID-19 pandemic, Sony shifted the film's release to October 7, 2022.

In February 2021, Miller revealed that he and Lord were working on the film's screenplay with Callaham and said Peter Ramsey would serve as an executive producer on the sequel after co-directing the first film. That April, Kemp Powers and Justin K. Thompson were announced as co-directors of the sequel alongside Dos Santos, with all three having been working on the project since it started development. Thompson had previously served as production designer on the first film. Additionally, Arad and Steinberg were both confirmed to be returning as producers alongside Lord, Miller, and Pascal, with Alonzo Ruvalcaba co-producing and Aditya Sood, Into the Spider-Verse directors Bob Persichetti and Rodney Rothman, Rebecca Karch and Brian Michael Bendis joining Ramsey as executive producers. In December, Lord and Miller revealed that the film was being split into two parts, titled Spider-Man: Across the Spider-Verse (Part One) and (Part Two), because they had written down the story they wanted to tell for the sequel and realized that it was too much for a single film. Work on both parts was taking place simultaneously. The two sequels were renamed in April 2022, becoming Spider-Man: Across the Spider-Verse and Spider-Man: Beyond the Spider-Verse. Their release dates were shifted then, with Across the Spider-Verse pushed back to June 2, 2023. Lord and Miller revealed that they told Sony the sequel would be the same size as Into the Spider-Verse, but it ended up having the largest crew of any animated film ever, with around 1,000 people working on it. They added that the film has 240 characters and takes place in six universes.

Casting 
By December 2018, Shameik Moore and Hailee Steinfeld were set to reprise their respective roles as Miles Morales and Gwen Stacy from the first film. Lord and Miller also expressed interest in including Spider-Punk, Takuya Yamashiro, the "Japanese Spider-Man" from the 1978 Spider-Man series and Italian Spiderman in the following movies. In November 2019 Lord indicated that the character Takuya Yamashiro was designed. In August 2020, Jake Johnson expressed hope that he could reprise his role as Peter B. Parker from the first film in the sequel. Issa Rae was cast as Jessica Drew / Spider-Woman in June 2021, Johnson confirmed that he would be returning for the sequel a month later, and Oscar Isaac was confirmed in December to be reprising his role of Miguel O'Hara / Spider-Man 2099 from the post-credits scene of Into the Spider-Verse. Also in December, Tom Holland—who plays Peter Parker / Spider-Man in the Marvel Cinematic Universe—revealed that Pascal had approached him about appearing in the Spider-Verse films during the filming of Spider-Man: No Way Home (2021). Holland and his co-stars Zendaya and Jacob Batalon all expressed interest in appearing in the upcoming films. Jeff Sneider of The Ankler claimed in February 2023 that Holland would appear in a live-action sequence and that his appearance had been the reason the movie was delayed from 2022 to 2023. Christopher Daniel Barnes, who voiced Spider-Man in Spider-Man: The Animated Series, also expressed interest in returning for the film.

In April 2022, Brian Tyree Henry and Luna Lauren Vélez were confirmed to be reprising their roles as Miles's parents from the first film while Rachel Dratch was revealed to be voicing the counselor at Miles's school. Lord, Miller, and the directors announced in June that Jonathan Ohnn / the Spot would be the film's main antagonist, with Jason Schwartzman providing the Spot's voice. Powers noted that the Spot was one of "the deepest cuts in Spider-Man's rogue gallery" but the creative team was excited about his abilities, which allow the character to travel between universes. Shea Whigham and Jorma Taccone were also revealed to be voicing George Stacy and the Vulture, respectively. Taccone previously voiced Norman Osborn / Green Goblin and Peter Parker / Spider-Man from the 1967 TV series in Into the Spider-Verse. In November 2022, Daniel Kaluuya was confirmed to voicing Hobart "Hobie" Brown / Spider-Punk in the film. In December 2022, with the reveal of the film's first poster, it was confirmed that the Peter Parker / Spider-Man from The Spectacular Spider-Man (2008–2009) would appear in the film. Spectacular showrunner Greg Weisman was not informed about the inclusion of his show's character and expressed doubts he would even be featured in the film itself. In January 2023, Nicolas Cage confirmed he would not be reprising his role of Spider-Man Noir for the film. In February 2023, it was revealed that Karan Soni has been cast as Pavitr Prabhakar / Spider-Man India in the film.

Animation and design 
Lord revealed that design work for new characters in the film had begun by November 2019, with comic book artist Kris Anka later revealing that he was serving as a character designer on the film. On June 9, 2020, the film's lead animator Nick Kondo announced that production had started. The different universes visited in the film were designed to look like they were each drawn by a different artist. Having learned new animation tools after working on The Mitchells vs. the Machines (2021) following the first Spider-Verse film, Lord and Miller ambitiously employed them to generate six different animation styles. The intent was to amaze the audience whenever the characters cross into a new environment so the film can accurately reflect its plot and the styles can generate various emotional backdrops. Earth-65, the home of Gwen Stacy, was designed to look like "impressionistic" watercolor paintings. The animation team created a simulator to generate this style and used a visual palette that reflects Gwen's emotions like a "three dimensional mood ring". This style was also intended by Miller to remind the audience about the covers of the Spider-Gwen comic books. One of the two alternate Earths seen in the trailer was Earth-50101, which the crew nicknamed "Mumbattan" after Mumbai and Manhattan, due to that world being based on the one from Gotham Entertainment Group's Spider-Man: India comic book series. The other one was Nueva York, the futuristic New York City from the Marvel 2099 world, based on the neo-futurist illustrations by Syd Mead. While the cast and crew being interviewed for Empire in March 2023, co-director Joaquim Dos Santos revealed that another universe would be "the punky New London, inhabited by Daniel Kaluuya's Spider-Punk", with a final dimension "being kept tightly under wraps for now". 

Miles's design was updated for the sequel to show him having gone through a growth spurt, while Gwen was given a new haircut and an updated costume. Rick Leonardi, the co-creator of Spider-Man 2099, was brought on to adapt his own designs for the film, while comic book artist Brian Stelfreeze was chosen to shape the visual development of Jessica Drew. The Spot's design evolves throughout the film as he gains more control of his abilities, beginning with a style that looks like an "unfinished sketch [with] blue construction lines that evoke a comic book artist's rough drawing before the work goes to an inker". The Spot's portals were intended to look like "living ink that had spilled or splattered on the comic artist's drawing", which created new challenges for the animation team. The Vulture was given a Renaissance-era design inspired by the artwork of Leonardo da Vinci's workbooks.

Music 
Daniel Pemberton confirmed in December 2020 that he would return from the previous film to compose the sequel's score.

Phil Lord and Christopher Miller confirmed on December 13, 2022, that Metro Boomin would create music for the sequel.

Marketing 
In May 2020, Sony entered into a promotional partnership with Hyundai Motor Company to showcase their new models and technologies in the film. A prologue for the film was released at Comic Con Experience in December 2021, revealing the title and the fact that the film is a two-part sequel. Following the announcement of the new title and release date in April 2022, Lord and Miller showed 15 minutes of the film (with unfinished animation) at Sony's CinemaCon panel. Lord, Miller, and the directors showed the same footage at the Annecy International Animation Film Festival in June, with updated animation and effects. In February 2022, Funko Pops figures based on characters from the film were revealed.

Release

Theatrical 
Spider-Man: Across the Spider-Verse is scheduled to be released in the United States on June 2, 2023, in premium large formats and IMAX. It was originally set for release on April 8, 2022, but was shifted to October 7 due to the COVID-19 pandemic. It was then moved to the June 2023 date.

Home media 
In April 2021, Sony signed deals with Netflix and Disney for the rights to their 2022 to 2026 film slate, following the films' theatrical and home media windows. Netflix signed for exclusive "pay 1 window" streaming rights, which is typically an 18-month window and included the sequels to Spider-Man: Into the Spider-Verse; this deal built on an existing output deal that Netflix had signed with Sony Pictures Animation in 2014. Disney signed for "pay 2 window" rights for the films, which would be streamed on Disney+ and Hulu as well as broadcast on Disney's linear television networks.

Future

Sequel 
A third film was confirmed when Lord and Miller revealed in December 2021 that the Into the Spider-Verse sequel was being split into two films. Spider-Man: Across the Spider-Verse (Part Two) was expected at that point to be released in 2023. In April 2022, it was renamed Spider-Man: Beyond the Spider-Verse and given a release date of March 29, 2024.

Spin-off 
Sony began developing a Spider-Women film in November 2018 that would focus on three generations of female, Spider-related characters. Bek Smith was writing the spin-off, and Lauren Montgomery was in talks to direct. Pascal said the film would focus on the characters Gwen Stacy / Spider-Gwen, Cindy Moon / Silk, and Jessica Drew / Spider-Woman, and said Across the Spider-Verse would serve as a "launching pad" for it.

References

External links 
 
 

2020s American animated films
2020s animated superhero films
2020s coming-of-age comedy films
2020s English-language films
2023 action comedy films
2023 computer-animated films
2023 directorial debut films
African-American superhero films
American children's animated action films
American children's animated superhero films
Animated films based on Marvel Comics
Animated films set in New York City
Animated superheroine films
Animated teen superhero films
Columbia Pictures animated films
Columbia Pictures films
Films about parallel universes
Films based on works by Brian Michael Bendis
Films directed by Joaquim Dos Santos
Films postponed due to the COVID-19 pandemic
Films produced by Amy Pascal
Films produced by Avi Arad
Films produced by Phil Lord and Christopher Miller
Films scored by Daniel Pemberton
Films with screenplays by Christopher Miller (filmmaker)
Films with screenplays by David Callaham
Films with screenplays by Kemp Powers
Films with screenplays by Phil Lord
Metafictional works
Sony Pictures Animation films
Spider-Man films
Spider-Verse (franchise)
Upcoming sequel films